Pelli SandaD is a 2021 Indian Telugu-language musical romantic comedy film directed by debutant Gowri Ronanki under the supervision of K. Raghavendra Rao. Produced by Madhavi Kovelamudi, Shobu Yarlagadda and Prasad Devineni, the film features Roshan Meka and Sreeleela in lead roles. 

The film is a spiritual sequel of the 1996 film of the same name. It marks the acting debut of Raghavendra Rao who directed the previous film and Sree Leela in Telugu . It was released on 15 October 2021.

Premise
Maya is an aspirant filmmaker, who expresses interest to helm the biopic of Dronacharya awardee Vasishta. She threatens to commit suicide in case Vasishta doesn't authorise the project and tell his story. The reluctant Vashshta budges and goes down the memory to narrate his story of how he won over his love interest Sahasra. Many years ago,  Vasishta and Sahasra meet at a wedding and it is a  love at first sight for both of them. The main obstacle to their union is Sahasra's father Pattabhi Ramayya, who is the strict family patriarch who is completely against love marriages. How does Vasishta convince a headstrong father and prove that he's a worthy match for his daughter forms the rest of the story.

Cast

 Roshan Meka as Ravipati Vasishta and Vasishta's son (dual role)
 K. Raghavendra Rao as old Vasishta
 Sree Leela as Kondaveeti Sahasra
 Deepti Bhatnagar as old Sahasra
 Shivani Rajashekar as Maya
 Rajendra Prasad as Maya's father 
 Prakash Raj as Kondaveeti Veera Venkata Pattabhi Seetharamayya, Sahasra's father
 Rao Ramesh as Vashishta's father
 Vithika Sheru as Janaki, Sahasra's sister
 Posani Krishna Murali as Kanchukatla Anjaneyulu
 Vennela Kishore as Chintu Sahasra's fiancee 
 Tanikella Bharani as Vashishta's uncle 
Annapurna as Sahasra's grandmother 
Satyam Rajesh as Priest Mangalam
Srinivasa Reddy as Maya's father's assistant
 Raghu Babu as cameo
 Jhansi as Vashishta's Mother 
 Fish Venkat as Ramayya's henchmen 
 Shakalaka Shankar as Vashishta's uncle
Pragathi as Vashishta's aunt
Hema
Kireeti Damaraju as Ram, Sahasra's brother-in-law 
Bharani 
Babu Mohan as Subbayya Babai

Production
The film was planned in October 2020 as sequel to 1996 film Pelli Sandadi that starred Srikanth, Ravali and Deepthi Bhatnagar. K. Raghavendra Rao decided to supervise the direction of the sequel with  Gowri Ronanki making her directorial debut. Incidentally Srikanth's elder son, Roshan Meka, was selected to play the male lead in the sequel. 

Initially, it was reported that actor Sridevi's daughter Khushi Kapoor will be female lead opposite Roshan, but it was not finalized. In October 2020, actress Malavika Nair was signed to pair opposite Meka, but she was later replaced by Sree Leela in January 2021. Filming was completed in July 2021 and post production began in the same month.

Release
The film was initially planned for release in September 2021, but was postponed due to COVID-19 pandemic in India. It was released on 15 October 2021. Later, it premiered on ZEE5 on 24 June 2022.

Soundtrack

The soundtrack is composed by M. M. Keeravani and lyrics are penned by Chandrabose. "Premante Enti" first track of the soundtrack was released on 27 April 2021 by Aditya Music. "Bujjulu Bujjulu" the second song was unveiled on 23 May. Title track "Pelli SandaD" was released on 12 August 2021, and fourth track "Madhura Nagarilo" was released on 29 September 2021, along with audio album.

Reception
Thadhagath Pathi reviewing for The Times of India rated the film with 2.5 stars out of 5 and wrote, "Pelli SandaD remains a strictly watchable fare with the lead actors coming into their own. But don't expect anything fresh or remotely logical." Y Sunita Chowdhary of The Hindu felt that "the film is a Manmohan Desai style of ending with a battle between the divine and the evil where a young, small-built Roshan has a showdown with big-bodied men amidst spears, colour and a Hanuman idol. The film can be touted as a costly showreel for Roshan and Sree Leela". Eenadu stated that soundtrack and performance of lead actors are the positives, and, screenplay, story and first-half are the negatives of the film. A reviewer of NTV criticized film's screenplay and felt that it has an outdated story. They also stated that Raghavendra Rao's acting is a minus for the film.

References

External links

 

2021 films
Films scored by M. M. Keeravani
Indian sequel films
Indian romantic comedy films
Indian romantic musical films
2020s romantic musical films
Films about Indian weddings
2021 romantic comedy films
2021 directorial debut films
2020s Telugu-language films